Mayingila N'Zuzi Mata (born 17 May 1994), also known as Kévin N'Zuzi Mata, is a French professional footballer who plays as a forward for Turkish club Tuzlaspor. He is of Congolese descent.

Career
N'Zuzi Mata began his career with Chamois Niortais, where he made five appearances in Ligue 2 during the 2014–15 season. He went on to join FC Chambly on a one-year deal in the summer of 2015, after being released by Niort.

In June 2016 he signed a professional contract with Paris Saint-Germain to play with the reserve team in Championnat de France Amateur.

In the summer of 2017 he moved to Boulogne-Billancourt in Championnat National 2 and in 2018 he joined Dunkerque in Championnat National.

In July 2019 he signed for Red Star. There, he made 17 appearances in which he failed to score.

In August 2020, it was announced that N'Zuzi Mata had signed a one-year contract with the option of an additional year with Belgian First Division B club RWDM.

Career statistics

References

1994 births
Footballers from Paris
French sportspeople of Democratic Republic of the Congo descent
Black French sportspeople
Living people
French footballers
Association football forwards
Chamois Niortais F.C. players
FC Chambly Oise players
AC Boulogne-Billancourt players
USL Dunkerque players
Red Star F.C. players
RWDM47 players
Tuzlaspor players
Ligue 2 players
Championnat National players
Championnat National 2 players
Challenger Pro League players
TFF First League players
French expatriate footballers
Expatriate footballers in Belgium
French expatriate sportspeople in Belgium
Expatriate footballers in Turkey
French expatriate sportspeople in Turkey